GDMC (short for Generative Design in Minecraft) is a programming competition to create procedurally generated settlements in Minecraft. The competition is organized by academics from New York University, the University of Hertfordshire and the Queen Mary University of London.

Organisers 
 Michael Cerny Green (New York University)
 Christoph Salge (University of Hertfordshire)
 Rodrigo Canaan (New York University)
 Christian Guckelsberger (Queen Mary University of London)
 Julian Togelius (New York University)

References

External links 
 
 

Programming contests
Recurring events established in 2018